Riverstown, historically called Ballyederdaowen, is a village in County Sligo, Ireland. Known for its musical tradition it is located at a bridging point of the River Unshin (Arrow), 17.2 km (10 miles) south of Sligo town and 4 km east of the N4 road.

Amenities
Amenities and notable buildings in the area include the post office, Coopershill House and the Garda barracks (built ). There are also a number of pubs and shops.

The Roman Catholic church in Riverstown, the Church of the Sacred Heart, was built in 1940.

Culture and community
Each year the village hosts the Riverstown Vintage Festival on the June Bank Holiday Weekend, and the James Morrison Traditional Music Festival during the August Bank Holiday Weekend.

During the 1990s, Riverstown and the Brookeborough Community Development Association launched the 'Riverbrooke Cross-Border Initiative' linking the two villages in a programme of cross-community/cross-border working.

Folk park
Sligo Folk Park, situated at the east end of the town, was created as the result of a community effort in the 1990s.

People
El Marqués de Osorno, Viceroy of Peru, was a Spanish military officer and colonial administrator in Chile and Peru from 1788 to 1801. He was born Ambrose O'Higgins at Ballynary, about halfway between Riverstown and Ballinafad.
Michael Bowles (1909–1998), conductor and composer, born in Riverstown.
James Morrison (1893–1947), South Sligo-style fiddler was born in the townland of Drumfin close to Riverstown.

Gallery

See also
 List of towns and villages in Ireland

References

Towns and villages in County Sligo
Articles on towns and villages in Ireland possibly missing Irish place names